Klaus Beckmann (11 August 1944 – 27 May 1994) was a German politician of the Free Democratic Party (FDP) and former member of the German Bundestag.

Life 
From 1980 until his death Beckmann was a member of the German Bundestag. Here he was Parliamentary Secretary of the FDP parliamentary group from 1983 to 1989. In July 1989, Klaus Beckmann was appointed Parliamentary State Secretary to the Federal Minister of Economics. He resigned from this office in September 1992 due to serious illness. He left behind a wife and three daughters.

Literature

References

1944 births
1994 deaths
Members of the Bundestag for North Rhine-Westphalia
Members of the Bundestag 1990–1994
Members of the Bundestag 1987–1990
Members of the Bundestag 1983–1987
Members of the Bundestag 1980–1983
Members of the Bundestag for the Free Democratic Party (Germany)
Parliamentary State Secretaries of Germany